Bani Ghaylan is a sub-district located in At Taffah District, Al Bayda Governorate, Yemen.  Bani Ghaylan had a population of 926 according to the 2004 census.

References 

Sub-districts in At Taffah District